Shaheed Ahsan Ullah Master Stadium is a multi-purpose stadium in Tongi, Gazipur.

Archery
Shaheed Ahsan Ullah Master Stadium served as the venue for the ISSF International Solidarity World Ranking Archery Championship. The stadium also hosted Bangladesh Archery Cup & 11th National Archery Championship in 2019.

Football
Uttar Baridhara Club using this stadium as their new home venue for 2021 Bangladesh Premier League. And Swadhinata KS using as a their home venue since 2021–22 season.

See also
 Stadiums in Bangladesh
 List of football stadiums in Bangladesh

References

Football venues in Bangladesh